The American Family Insurance Championship is a professional golf tournament in Wisconsin on the PGA Tour Champions, played at University Ridge Golf Course in Madison. The inaugural edition in June 2016 featured an 81-player field and a $2 million purse in a no-cut 54-hole event.

History
American Family Insurance signed a three-year agreement to be the tournament's initial title sponsor. Steve Stricker served as tournament host in 2016 and then as player-host starting in 2017, when he turns fifty and is eligible to play. Proceeds raised will support the Steve Stricker American Family Insurance Foundation, the American Family Children's Hospital, and The First Tee of South Central Wisconsin.

Kirk Triplett won the debut event in 2016 with a final round 65 (−7) for 199 (−17), two strokes ahead of runners-up Bart Bryant and Mike Goodes. After making his only bogey of the final round at the tenth hole, Triplett birdied five of the next six, then concluded with two pars.

Host
Born in Edgerton, Wisconsin, and a Madison resident, Stricker is an American Family Insurance brand ambassador. He co-chairs the Steve Stricker American Family Insurance Foundation, founded in 2013. In addition to his twelve wins on the PGA Tour, Stricker represented the United States on five Presidents Cup teams and three Ryder Cup teams, and ranked second in the world rankings in 2010. He won the Wisconsin State Open five times between 1987 and 2000.

Course 

Designed by Robert Trent Jones Jr., University Ridge opened  in 1991 and is home to the University of Wisconsin men's and women's golf teams. The , par-72 course features an open front nine and a more forested back nine. It hosted the NCAA women's championships in 1998 as well as multiple Big Ten Conference championships. The front nine has three par fives and three par threes.

Championship tees

Winners

References

External links
 
 Coverage on the PGA Tour Champions' official site
 University Ridge Golf Course 
 Steve Stricker American Family Insurance Foundation 
 American Family Children's Hospital

PGA Tour Champions events
Golf in Wisconsin